Duality is the second studio album by American band Set It Off. The album was released on October 14, 2014 through record labels Equal Vision Records and Rude Records. The album was announced on August 13, 2014, alongside the announcement of a tour with rock bands Black Veil Brides and Falling in Reverse.

Track listing
All tracks are produced by Brandon Paddock, except where noted.

Charts

References

2014 albums
Set It Off (band) albums
Equal Vision Records albums